Batuley (Gwatle lir) is a language spoken on the Aru Islands of eastern Indonesia. It is close to Mariri; Hughes  (1987) estimates that around 80% of lexical items are shared. The language's name comes from the Gwatle island (Batuley in Indonesian), which the Batuley consider their homeland (Daigle (2015)).

Geographical distribution
Batuley is spoken in eastern Indonesia across seven villages that Daigle (2015) lists in his thesis. Some of them are Kabalsiang on Aduar Island, Kumul in the identically-named island, and Gwaria (Waria) in the Island of Gwari.

Phonology

Vowels
Batuley has a simple five-vowel system with no vowel length distinction (Daigle 2015).
i
e
u
o
a

Furthermore,  and  may both be reduced to a schwa in fast speech in certain conditions.

Consonants
Daigle (2015)

Lexicon
Daigle (2015)
 : water, fresh water
 : island
 : sister; branch
 : big house
 : wood, tree
 : chest, breast
 : breast milk (: breast, : its water)
 : scorpion
 : small fresh-water turtle
 : cloud
 : dance (n)
 : month
 : shoe (borrowing)
 : diesel  fuel (borrowing)
 : zero (borrowing)
 : think (borrowing)
 : cat (borrowing)
 : teacher (borrowing)
 : paper (borrowing)
 : crack, split (borrowing)
 : hat (borrowing)
 : older sibling (borrowing)
 : year (borrowing)
 : book (borrowing)

References

Further reading
 

Aru languages
Languages of Indonesia